The Central European Labour Studies Institute (CELSI) is a research institute based in Bratislava, Slovakia that specialises in broadly defined labor issues, labour markets, and labor policy.

Formation 

CELSI was founded in 2008 by Martin Kahanec and Marta Kahancova. At that time Marta Kahancova was a postdoctoral research fellow at the Max Planck Institute for the Study of Societies, Cologne, Germany, and Martin Kahanec was the deputy director of research at the Institute for the Study of Labor, Bonn, Germany and currently is a professor of economics at the School of Public Policy at the Central European University in Budapest, Hungary.  

Their objective was to create an institution where ideas and knowledge about labour markets in Central and Eastern Europe could be nurtured and shared. Therefore, as well as being an independent research institute with its own in-house research team, CELSI was also conceived as a means for building a network of research fellows across the globe. CELSI aims to contribute to evidence-based policy-making by providing salient knowledge about the functioning of labor markets.

Research 

CELSI’s research is published in international peer-reviewed journals, such as the Economics of Transition, International Journal of Manpower, European Journal of Industrial Relations, International Migration Review, and the IZA Journal of Migration. Books authored or edited by CELSI researchers have been published by renowned international publishers, including Palgrave, Edward Elgar, or Springer; book chapters appeared in edited volumes published by Oxford University Press. CELSI has participated in international research projects, including EU’s Framework Programmes and Horizon 2020 programmes. CELSI was an affiliate partner of the Marie Curie International Training Network EDUWORKS.

Research Areas 

Currently, CELSI focuses on the following research areas:
Labour Markets and Institutions
Work and Institutions
Business and Society
Ethnicity and Migration

Discussion Papers 

CELSI’s flagship publication platform is its Discussion Paper series, which presents papers by academics from various different disciplines related to labour and migration issues.  Its objective is to promote the sharing of knowledge and expertise between diverse social science disciplines, such as economics, political science, social anthropology and social psychology.

Research Reports and Policy Briefs 

CELSI also publishes a Research Report series, which presents detailed policy studies by CELSI’s in-house researchers as well as associate researchers, often in cooperation with international organizations, such as the European Commission  and the World Bank. Policy CELSI also publishes a Policy Brief series to disseminate the key findings from its research work to a broader policy audience.

Recognition 

Since 2012, CELSI has been listed as the #1 economic research institute in Slovakia by RePEc, and its Scientific Director, Dr. Martin Kahanec, is listed as the #1 contributing author. CELSI regularly ranks among top 50 think tanks globally (No. 2 in Central and Eastern Europe) and top 200 institutions in the field of Economics of Human Migration in the world in the RePEc rankings.
 
In June 2013, CELSI Scientific Director Martin Kahanec was featured on BBC News for his contribution to a study which found welfare generosity has no impact on immigration.

References

External links 
 CELSI Home Page (English and Slovak)

2008 establishments in Slovakia
Education in Bratislava
Labor studies organizations